Searsole Raj High School is a high school located in Raniganj, West Bengal, India. Its alumni include Kazi Nazrul Islam, national poet of Bangladesh. Searsole Raj High School is a Bengali-medium boys only institution established in 1856. It has facilities for teaching from class V to class XII. The school has a library with 3,981 books and a playground.

See also
 Education in India
 List of schools in India
 Education in West Bengal

References

External links

High schools and secondary schools in West Bengal
Educational institutions established in 1856
1856 establishments in British India
Education in Asansol
Schools in Paschim Bardhaman district